Showaddywaddy are a rock and roll group from Leicester, England. They specialise in revivals of hit songs from the 1950s and early 1960s, while also issuing original material. They have spent 209 weeks on the UK Singles Chart, and have had 10 Top Ten singles, one reaching number one.

Formation
The band was formed in 1973 by the amalgamation of two groups, Choise and the Golden Hammers, the latter often known simply as The Hammers. They both played at the Fosse Way pub in Leicester, and soon discovered shared musical tastes. After playing together in jamming sessions, they joined together permanently, and Showaddywaddy were born. This led to an eight-member band, with the unusual feature of having two vocalists, two drummers, two guitarists, and two bassists. The band's first professional gig was at the Dreamland Ballroom in Margate, Kent, on 1 September 1973.

Hits
Showaddywaddy won one programme on the ATV series New Faces, in November 1973, and were runners-up in the "All Winners Final", which was broadcast on 28 December 1973. They have made nearly 300 television appearances, including their own BBC TV special, Showaddywaddyshow, broadcast between Christmas and New Year in 1980. The band also appeared in the 1975 film Three for All, where they performed "The Party" from their 1974 debut album.
Their first single, "Hey Rock and Roll" (written by the band), was released in April 1974. It reached number two on the UK Singles Chart. Starting with "Dancin' Party" (1977), the band produced their own records with more cover versions including "I Wonder Why" (originally by Dion and the Belmonts), "Blue Moon" (based on the Marcels' interpretation) and another Curtis Lee original "Pretty Little Angel Eyes" and co-written by Tommy Boyce. After their first single, Showaddywaddy went on to have a further 22 UK hits until late summer 1982. Their most recent chart single was "Who Put the Bomp", a number 37 hit in 1982, which they also promoted in their final Top of the Pops performance. In total, they had ten top-ten singles, a solitary number one ("Under the Moon of Love" in 1976), and spent 209 weeks in the UK Singles Chart, including seven successive top-five entries. Their biggest-selling single was "Under the Moon of Love", which sold 985,000 copies.

They had most of their biggest hits with covers of songs from the 1950s and the early 1960s. These included "Three Steps to Heaven" (originally by Eddie Cochran in 1960), "Heartbeat" (originally written and recorded by Buddy Holly), "Under the Moon of Love" (originally a US hit for Curtis Lee in 1961, again co-written by Tommy Boyce), "When" (originally by the Kalin Twins), "You Got What It Takes" (originally by Marv Johnson) and "Dancin' Party" (originally by Chubby Checker). These six singles were all produced by Mike Hurst (a former member of the Springfields). On the South African chart, "Three Steps to Heaven" reached number 6 in 1975 and "Under the Moon of Love" number 6 in 1977.

Later period

Malcolm Allured left the group in 1984, followed by Russ Field in 1985, and Buddy Gask in 1987. Gask retired to Spain in 2005, and died in 2011 after suffering with ill health for a number of years. Field runs a guest house with his wife in Beadnell, Northumberland, and still plays guitar in a local covers band, Before The Mast. Allured owns a nightclub called MFN at Shipley Gate, Derbyshire, and still plays live in local bands. Field was replaced by Ray Martinez in 1985, who was subsequently replaced by Danny Willson in 1995.

Cherry Red Records began to release Showaddywaddy's extensive album back catalogue on CD from 2000 on their 7Ts imprint. The reissues featured rare bonus tracks, B-sides and non-album singles.

Early in 2008, the band finished recording their album The Sun Album (I Betcha Gonna Like It), released on Voiceprint Records. A special limited edition (500 copies only) was available, signed by the whole band and comprised the CD, a DVD, special packaging and extended sleeve notes. In September 2011, lead singer Dave Bartram released his long-lost solo recordings from 1982–85 on Invisible Hands Music. The original tapes had been in his loft for 25 years. The seventeen-track album was entitled Lost and Found.

Al James retired from the band in 2008, playing his last gig with the band at the Cheese & Grain in Frome, Somerset, on 20 December 2008. In early 2009, Trevor Oakes decided to take a break from the band due to ill health. He left the band and officially retired on 1 May 2009, meaning his last gig was also at the Cheese & Grain. Trevor Oakes is the father of footballers Scott Oakes and Stefan Oakes. Challenger is the father of Benjamin Challenger who trialled for Leicester City before playing basketball for Leicester Riders then moving into athletics, gained medals in the high jump at the 1998 and 2002 Commonwealth Games. Danny Willson also left the band during 2009 to join Martin Turner's Wishbone Ash, and his last gig was in Denmark on 8 August that year.

Lead singer Dave Bartram left Showaddywaddy on 3 December 2011 after 38 years fronting the band, and his last gig was at the Kings Hall Theatre in Ilkley, West Yorkshire. Bartram continues as the band's manager, a role he has undertaken since 1984. The Ilkley gig also marked saxophonist David Graham's last gig, who had been touring with the band since August 2009.

In 2013, the band celebrated its 40th anniversary and undertook a UK wide tour between 11 January and 1 June. On 17 June 2013, the band released a new collection of its entire studio recordings to celebrate their anniversary. The anthology featured the band's entire 20th century catalogue of recorded material, including all of their original studio albums in mini-vinyl replica wallets, non-album A and B sides, together with a selection of alternative mixes and unreleased rarities unearthed from the vaults, in a 139-track, 10-CD box set. A 36-page booklet included a 7,000-word liner note from Showaddywaddy expert Steve Thorpe, and an introduction from former band member Dave Bartram. Also June 2013 saw the release of their only live album to date. It contained 16 of their most famous tracks. This album was only available at live gigs with a pressing of only 1,000 copies.

Bartram did his first solo post-Showaddywaddy appearance on 1 November 2013, at Upstairs At The Western, a venue above The Western pub in Leicester, where he was interviewed by a compere and took questions from the audience in "an evening with" type format. He also performed three acoustic numbers on the night, "Smiling Eyes", "Three Steps To Heaven" and "Hey Rock And Roll" – the performance of "Smiling Eyes" was the song's first live performance, having been originally released some 38 years earlier on the 1975 Step Two album.

Rod Deas retired from the band early in 2019, playing his last gig with Showaddywaddy at The Qube in Corby on Friday 25 January. Dave Bartram returned to the stage to give Rod a farewell speech before the second set. Guitarist Ray Hatfield (who joined January 2017 when Paul Dixon left), keyboardist Dean Loach, and bassist Billy Norman (who joined the band in January 2018) all left Showaddywaddy in the summer of 2020.
Former guitarist Danny Willson returned to play with the band in September 2021 on a temporary arrangement.

Showaddywaddy have continued to tour, and still do around 100 dates a year in the UK and Europe. The band currently consists of one remaining original member, Romeo Challenger, along with vocalist Andy Pelos, bass player Tom Bull, guitarist and drummer Sam Holland, vocalist and guitarist Billy Shannon, and saxophonist/guitarist David Graham who rejoined the band in 2020 (having previously toured with the band 2009 to 2011).
 In June 2014, Showaddywaddy completed the "Once In A Lifetime" arena tour, with Bay City Rollers, David Essex, and The Osmonds. The same month saw the reissue of Showaddywaddy's 2008 The Sun Album (I Betcha Gonna Like It), which contained two new tracks.

Band members
Original members listed in bold

Current
Romeo Challenger (born 19 May 1950, St John's, Antigua, West Indies) — drums (1973–present)
Andy Pelos — vocals / guitar (2012–present)
David Graham — saxophone (2009–2011) — guitar / saxophone (2020–present)
Tom Bull — bass guitar (2020–present)
Billy Shannon — guitar / vocals (2021–present)
Sam Holland — guitar / drums (2021–present)

Former
Malcolm "Duke" Allured (born 27 August 1945, Leicester) — drums (1973–1984)
Dave Bartram (born 23 March 1952, Leicester) — vocals (1973–2011)
Russ Field (born James Lewis Russell Field, 1 September 1949, Berwick-upon-Tweed) — guitar (1973–1985)
Buddy Gask (born William George Gask, 18 December 1945, Leicester – 7 June 2011, Spain) — vocals (1973–1987)
Al James (born Geoffrey Betts, 13 January 1946, Leicester – 16 November 2018) — bass / vocals (1973–2008)
Trevor Oakes (born Trevor Leslie Oakes, 9 September 1946, Leicester) — guitar (1973–2008)
Rod Deas (born 13 February 1948, Scarborough) — bass (1973–2019)
Ray Martinez — guitar (1985–1995)
Danny Willson — guitar (1995–2009)
Paul Dixon — guitars / vocals (2008–2017)
Dean Loach — keyboards / guitar / backing vocals (2012–2020)
Ray Hatfield — guitar / vocals (2017–2020)
Billy Norman — bass guitar / backing vocals (2018–2020)
Chris Savage — keyboards (2020)

Discography

Showaddywaddy (1974)
Step Two (1975)
Trocadero (1976)
Red Star (1977)
Crepes & Drapes (1979)
Bright Lights (1980)
Good Times (1981)
Living Legends (1983)
Jump, Boogie & Jive (1991)
The One & Only – Greatest & Latest (1996)
Hey Rock 'n' Roll (2002)
I Love Rock 'n' Roll (2006)
The Sun Album (I Betcha Gonna Like It) (2008)
Next Chapter (2016)

References

External links
Official Showaddywaddy website
Interviews from the Leicester Mercury, on the Leicester Band's website

Musical groups established in 1973
English glam rock groups
Rockabilly music groups
Musical groups from Leicester
Musicians from Leicestershire
British rock and roll music groups
1973 establishments in England
Arista Records artists
Bell Records artists
RCA Records artists